The Istanbul Football Cup was a football competition for Istanbul clubs in Turkey. The cup replaced the Istanbul Shield in 1942 and lasted until 1947. The final match between Beşiktaş and Fenerbahçe was cancelled in 1947.

Past winners

References

 
Defunct football cup competitions in Turkey
1942 establishments in Turkey
1947 disestablishments in Turkey
Sport in Istanbul
Recurring sporting events established in 1942
Recurring sporting events disestablished in 1947